Vorenjan (also Romanized as Vorenjān and Varenjān; also known as Biringu) is a village in Qaen Rural District, in the Central District of Qaen County, South Khorasan Province, Iran. At the 2006 census, its population was 51, in 15 families.

References 

Populated places in Qaen County